Volodymyr Petrovych Semynozhenko (born 9 June 1950) is a Ukrainian politician and scientist. Semynozhenko is a former Vice Premier Minister of Ukraine (in 1999, 2001–2002 and in 2010) and head of the Association of Ukrainian Scientists, and is now a member of the Board of the National Academy of Sciences, and served as the Chair of the Parliament Committee on Sciences and Technology. He is also the author of Ukrainian Legislation on Technology Parks. Semynozhenko was the party leader of the Party of Regions from late 2001 until early 2003. Since March 2009 Semynozhenko is party leader of the party New Politics. In addition, he created and served as the Head of the Ministry of Sciences and Technologies of Ukraine from 1996 to 1998, and has led numerous technology and innovation Committees in the Cabinet of Ministers.

Education
Semynozhenko graduated with honors in 1967 from the Magnet School specializing in physics and mathematics. He later graduated from Kharkiv State University’s School of Physics and Technology in 1972. In 1974, Semynozhenko defended his Ph.D. dissertation, and in 1984 acquired his Doctorate in physics and mathematics. In 1988 he became a Professor and in 1992 he was named the Academician of the National Academy of Sciences of Ukraine

Scientific work
Semynozhenko is a scholar, a Board Member for the National Academy of Sciences of Ukraine, a Professor and author of more than 500 widely distributed scientific papers and books, and the holder of more than 80 patents.
For more than 10 years of his life (from 1975 to 1985) he was devoted to the Boris Verkin's Institute for Low Temperature Physics and Engineering of the National Academy of Sciences of Ukraine. Semynozhenko became the Head of the Ukraine State Scientific Institution "Institute for Mono Crystals" of the National Academy of Sciences of Ukraine in 1985. This Institution was later transformed into one of the first technology parks in Ukraine.

Semynozhenko is a dedicated supporter of young and promising scientists and innovators. Thus, he was one of the first public figures to develop a system of state grants for young, talented scientists.

Since 2006 has served as the Head of the Board of Directors for the Scientific Intersectorial Corporation “New Technologies and Materials”. During his work in Parliament he led the Intersectorial Committee for Intellectual Property Management.

Semynozhenko also took the lead at the [Ukrainian Scientific Association]. This is the non-government organization which provides consistent assistance to scientific, technical and innovative activity in Ukraine. For his work, he was awarded a government medal for his vision and advancement of the Ukrainian scientific community.

Semynozhenko became the head of the national scientific-technical program "The Optoelectronic Technologies Development in Ukraine in 2005-2007".

Mr. Semynozhenko believes the National Academy of Sciences of Ukraine, as the leading Ukrainian science and technology community, is of vital strategic value to its people. As such, he feels it should be integral part of the Ukrainian government. His belief is that [The National Academy of Sciences of Ukraine] should be directly involved in forming the political vision, and in leading the development of, the scientific community within Ukraine.

He is the Editor-in-chief of "Problems of Science" and "Functional Materials" magazines, and a member of the editorial boards of several scientific editions. Among these is the theoretical and practical magazine of the National Security and Defense Council of Ukraine named "Strategic Panorama".

Innovations
Mr. Vladimir Semynozhenko has long been a champion of innovation and invention in Ukraine and has worked vigorously to develop the political climate, legal structure and business environment that Ukraine needs to foster growth. Most notably, Vladimir authored and implemented "The Law for Special Conditions for Innovation Activity in Technology Parks (1999)". This law, targeting "brain drain" in Ukraine, has helped facilitate significant partnerships and business opportunities between blue chip western companies and the incredible talent pool available in Ukraine. Semynozhenko's numerous activities have led to the emergence of Ukraine as one of the world's leading locations for technology and engineering innovation.

Throughout his considerable career, Semynozhenko has served as the Minister for Science and Technology of Ukraine (1996–1998), the [Vice Prime Minister of Ukraine], and as the Science and Technology Advisor to the President of Ukraine (1999, 2001–2002, 2003–2005). In 2006, he was extended the honor of being named the Innovation Advisor to the Prime Minister of Ukraine. That same year, he became the President of the Civic and Political Leaders' Association, also known as the "Ukrainian Forum".

Mr. Semynozhenko firmly believes the Global Outsourcing Industry is a critical component to the development of the Ukrainian economy over the next ten years. As such, he now dedicates his time to developing this industry in Ukraine. Currently, the outsourcing industry in Ukraine is largely fragmented, underdeveloped, and with spotty support from the Ukrainian government. He uses his time and influence to lobby and partner with various government agencies to introduce Ukraine to the global market as a leader in the outsourcing industry. In fact, Mr. Semynozhenko has held industrious meetings with leading U.S. executives, such as Mr. Bill Gates and Mr. George Soros, regarding western investment and involvement in the development of the Ukrainian hi-tech industry.

Politics
During his long political career, Semynozhenko has been the head of several different parliament committees in Verkhovna Rada (Ukrainian parliament) including the "Parliament Committee for Social, Science and Technology and Humanitarian Development" and the "Ukrainian Investment Fund for Social Investment, Environmental Committee". He was twice elected a Vice Prime Minister of Ukraine, and he served as the Minister for Science and Technology of Ukraine from 1996-1998.

From 1999 to 2005, he served as the Science and Technology Advisor to the President of Ukraine.

Semynozhenko was the party leader of the Party of Regions from late 2001 until early 2003.

In 2006 he was extended the honor of being named the Innovation Advisor to the Prime Minister of Ukraine and from 1994 through 2006, he was the People’s Deputy of Ukraine.
Mr. Semynozhenko firmly believes that his position in government is not nearly as important as the role he plays in, and the impact that he can have on, the future of Ukraine.
Mr. Semynozhenko formed the Ministry of Science and Technology and later became a member of the committee for selecting the most valuable science and technology projects for the Cabinet of Ministers of Ukraine. In his public life, Semynozhenko has authored and championed many new laws that directly led to the social and economic welfare of the Ukrainian scientific community and the greater population as a whole.

An independent politician, Semynozhenko maintains an opinion considered very valuable to many political leaders, and in 1998 he was awarded the Congressman of the year award. In 2006, he formed and led the political organization called the Ukrainian Forum. Its purpose is an analysis of national and political trends and their effect on both the Ukraine, and the rest of the world.

On March 11, 2010 Semynozhenko was elected Vice Premier Minister in the Azarov Government. Semynozhenko is in charge of 16 areas, in particular, healthcare, education, intellectual property, advertising, exhibition activities, and language policy. A bill on the dismissal of Semynozhenko was registered in the Verkhovna Rada, Ukraine's parliament, on March 31, 2010 submitted by lawmaker Olha Bodnar of Bloc Yulia Tymoshenko. On July 2, 2010 Vice Prime Minister Semynozhenko was fired by the Verkhovna Rada. The next week he was appointed head of the State Committee for Science, Innovation and Information Support and appointed adviser to Prime Minister Mykola Azarov.

In March 2009 Semynozhenko was elected party leader of the party New Politics. In the 2012 Ukrainian parliamentary election this party won 0.10% of the national votes and no constituencies and thus failed to win parliamentary representation.

Semynozhenko again took part in the July 2019 Ukrainian parliamentary election, this time for the party Strength and Honor. But he was not elected after losing his constituency in Kharkiv with 13.9% of the votes.

Honors and awards
Mr. Semynozhenko was twice honored by the National Award of Ukraine in Science and Technology and is a Nuclear Physics International Award prize winner. He was awarded “For the National Service” of I, II and III degrees, by order of “Saint Volodymir the Great” of the IV degree. He was given an honorable letter of commendation by the Cabinet of Ministers of Ukraine and the Verkhovna Rada of Ukraine (the Ukrainian parliament).

For his hard work, leadership, and support of the education and scientific communities, Semynozhenko has been bestowed with the title of Honorary Professor from more than fifty universities, including:

Ivan Franko National University of L'viv
Karazin Kharkiv National University
National Technical University "Kharkov Polytechnical Institute"
National University "Ostroh Academy"
National Mining University
 Luhansk State Medical University 

In 1995, the "Person of the Year" award was formed as a national program to recognize the most valuable citizens in Ukraine. These individuals were singled out as those helping to lead the development and expansion of the country's future. Mr. Semynozhenko was recognized by the program on two separate occasions, and also is a permanent member of the program committee.

In 1999 he was named an Honorary Professor of Art at Kharkov State Academy of Design and Art.

Private life
Semynozhenko's paintings demonstrate the picturesque nature found in Ukraine, including many of the most beautiful places that the country has to offer. In addition to his painting, his photographs are an expression of his sense of the outer world.
Also a talented musician, Semynozhenko's music expresses those things which are beyond capturing by brush or in photographs. In 1992, he became an honored member of National Artists Council of Ukraine, and in 1998 became an Honored Member (academician) of the National Academy of Art of Ukraine. His photographic masterpieces are recognized by the National Photo Artists Council of Ukraine.

In 1999 he was proclaimed the Honored Professor of Art of Kharkiv State Academy of Art and Design. Today, he holds yearly exhibitions of his work and his ranks could be enumerated endlessly. The one thing can be stated for sure - he unites opposing ideas—he is a politician, a scientist and an artist.

Sources
gska2.rada.gov.ua
ukraine-children.org.ua
ludinaroku.com.ua
nas.gov.ua

References

External links

semynozhenko.com
semynozhenko.net

 

1950 births
Living people
Politicians from Kyiv
Vice Prime Ministers of Ukraine on humanitarian policy
20th-century Ukrainian physicists
National University of Kharkiv alumni
Party of Regions politicians
Independent politicians in Ukraine
Second convocation members of the Verkhovna Rada
Third convocation members of the Verkhovna Rada
School of Physics and Technology of University of Kharkiv alumni
Fourth convocation members of the Verkhovna Rada
Scientists from Kyiv